Ailton Menegussi (born 5 November 1962) is a Brazilian Roman Catholic bishop.

Ordained to the priesthood on 22 November 1998, Menegussi was named bishop of the Roman Catholic Diocese of Crateús, Brazil on 6 November 2013.

References 

1962 births
Living people
People from Espírito Santo
21st-century Roman Catholic bishops in Brazil
Roman Catholic bishops of Crateús